José Luis Romero may refer to:
 José Luis Romero (footballer) (born 1945), Spanish footballer
 José Luis Romero (journalist) (1967-2009), Mexican journalist